BizkaiBus is the name for bus services serving the province of Biscay, Spain. It is named after the Basque name of the province, Bizkaia. The buses can be identified by their distinctive green (until 2009 yellow) livery.

The bus network is integrated in the Barik card system.

Characteristics 
BizkaiBus is the result of the combination of several companies that offered bus travel services in the province of Biscay, TCSA, CAV, PESA, Encartaciones, Euskotren, Adnor and Autobuses de Lujua.  The service is funded by the authority of Biscay or Diputacion Foral and operates as many as 100 bus lines. Some of the lines are seasonal, and only operate during certain months, for example a number of summer season lines to beach areas.

Various bus companies have steadily joined the Bizkaibus consortium over the years. The bus lines of EuskoTren joined in the year 2002, Adnor joined in 2005, and Autobuses de Lujua in 2006.  Of the original companies offering bus public transport in Biscay Vigiola remains the only non-affiliated bus operator.

In 2006 the line between Bilbao and Castro Urdiales was excluded from Bizkaibus, as the line was solely funded by the Biscay local authority and the town of Castro Urdiales lies in the province of Cantabria.

Lines departing from Bilbao 
There are around 100 lines operated by Bizkaibus. The numbering system depends on the zone of Biscay. The routes in Uribe Kosta begin with 21, University routes begin with 23, the routes on the left bank of Greater Bilbao begin with 31, those of the right bank of Greater Bilbao are prefixed 34, the River Nervion area routes are designated with the number 36, the Encartaciones region  33, the routes operated by the company CAV the number 35, and PESA the number 39.

External links

Official site

Biscay
Transport in Bilbao